NetSuite Inc. is an American cloud-based enterprise software company that provides products and services tailored for small and medium-sized businesses (SMBs) including accounting and financial management, customer relationship management, inventory management , human capital management, payroll, procurement, project management and e-commerce software. NetSuite was founded in 1998 with headquarters in Austin, Texas. The company is widely seen as the first cloud computing software company, with its founding pre-dating that of Salesforce.com by about a month. Oracle Corporation acquired NetSuite for approximately US$9.3 billion in November 2016. The Oracle NetSuite Global Business Unit is managed by Executive Vice President Evan Goldberg as "Oracle’s Cloud ERP for Small and Mid-sized Enterprises with the ability to scale to Fortune 500 firms."

History 
NetSuite can trace its beginning to a five-minute phone call between Evan Goldberg and Larry Ellison where the two discussed the idea of selling software over the internet. That conversation led Evan Goldberg to found NetLedger, NetSuite’s original name, in 1998. It offered web-hosted accounting software. The company was seeded with both start-up money from Oracle CEO Larry Ellison as well as a host of key staff previously employed at Oracle. The company’s Chairman and CTO and other management transitioned from Oracle to NetLedger. At one time the solution was licensed by Oracle, branded The Oracle Small Business Suite; however, that experience was short-lived, and the licensing deal was cancelled in 2004. Goldberg was the chairman and chief technology officer up until the Oracle acquisition.

In July 2002, Zach Nelson was appointed CEO. Prior to joining NetSuite, Nelson ran an early provider of business applications over the Internet called MyCIO.com, a division of McAfee Corp.  This experience led him to the belief that all software would be delivered over the internet, and he left McAfee to join NetSuite. He led the company from about $1 million in revenue to a billion-dollar run-rate prior to its acquisition by Oracle Corp.

In September 2003, the company officially changed its name from NetLedger to NetSuite, Inc. to reflect the company’s success in expanding its offerings to a suite of business applications beyond just accounting, including ERP, CRM and e-commerce.

On January 4, 2007, NetSuite named Oakland A's General Manager Billy Beane (of Moneyball fame) to its board of directors.

NetSuite became a publicly traded company after its initial public offering (IPO) of 6.2 million shares on the New York Stock Exchange in December 2007. On July 28, 2016, Oracle announced it had offered to purchase NetSuite for $9.3 billion. The deal closed in November.

NetSuite headquarters are located in Austin, Texas. NetSuite has additional offices in Denver, Colorado; Santa Monica and Redwood City, California; Chicago, Illinois; Atlanta, Georgia; New York City, New York; Boston, Massachusetts; Toronto, Canada; the United Kingdom; Spain; the Czech Republic; Hong Kong; Singapore; Australia; Brazil, and Uruguay.

Relationship with Oracle Corporation 
In 1998, Evan Goldberg received approximately $125 million in initial financial backing from Larry Ellison, founder and chief executive officer of Oracle Corporation through Ellison's venture capital entity Tako Ventures. Other initial investors were StarVest Partners, ADP and UBS PaineWebber. The NetSuite software also relies on database software licensed from Oracle.

Ellison and family members owned approximately 47.4% of NetSuite's common stock as of December 31, 2014. The firm's 10-Q filing on March 2, 2015, stated that "Mr. Ellison is able to exercise control over approval of significant corporate transactions, including a change of control or liquidation." 

On July 28, 2016, Oracle announced it had offered to purchase NetSuite for $9.3 billion. The deal faced intense scrutiny because Oracle founder, Larry Ellison, owned nearly 40% of NetSuite. This conflict of interest has led the board of both companies to establish independent committees to review the deal from the perspective of independent shareholders. Some major NetSuite shareholders, such as T. Rowe, notified Oracle they would not be tendering their shares under the current terms of the proposed deal. In early October 2016, Oracle extended the deadline for shareholders of NetSuite to tender their shares to November 4. The deal closed Nov. 7.

Products, services and support
NetSuite offers a modular suite of cloud-based business management applications. Depending on the choice of modules, the platform can support accounting capabilities like general ledger, accounts payable, accounts receivable, cash management, tax management, purchasing and inventory and order management, along with optional modules like customer relationship management, e-commerce, human resource and workforce management, payroll management, professional services automation, warehouse management and supply chain management, which can be activated as needed. The cost of a NetSuite subscription is not fixed, it depends on the modules selected and the number of users. The platform is accessed via the cloud and all data is centralized and stored in the cloud, allowing users to access data from different devices and countries. Fixed asset management, revenue recognition, planning and budgeting and subscription billing are also available. Multi-entity and global accounting and consolidation functionality is available at additional cost via NetSuite’s OneWorld module, which supports 27 languages, and multiple currencies and tax codes.

NetSuite offers analytics and reporting, which use the centralized data to provide real-time visibility into client company operational and financial performance. Pre-configured role-based dashboards and key performance indicators allow users to monitor business performance.

Products 

 NetSuite Analytics Warehouse - business intelligence and data insight capabilities with pre-built third-party data integrations
 NetSuite CPQ - supports sales teams with configure, price, and quote capabilities; integrated with NetSuite’s ERP, CRM, and e-commerce products
 NetSuite Connector - allows customers to integrate NetSuite products with e-commerce stores, online marketplaces, and point-of-sale systems such as Shopify, BigCommerce, Adobe Commerce, WooCommerce, Amazon, eBay, and Walmart
 NetSuite SuitePeople Workforce Management - supports shift scheduling, wage calculations, and workforce time and attendance tracking
 NetSuite ERP - the applications that make up NetSuite ERP run on the cloud and automate core business processes in finance, sales, HR, warehouse management, and supply chain management
 NetSuite AP Automation- automates invoice processing and paying vendors
 NetSuite Cloud Accounting - offers a general ledger, payment tracking, cash flow management, invoicing, accounts payable and receivable, and tax management
 NetSuite Accounts Payable - provides several automated capabilities, including, bill matching and approvals, payment reconciliation

Services 

 NetSuite Education Services - with this program, NetSuite offers training and certifications to help users improve their use of NetSuite. This service includes NetSuite Learning Cloud Support
 NetSuite Social Impact program - this program provides nonprofits with donated software and pro bono tech consulting; it includes Suite Donation, Suite Pro Bono, and Suite Capacity

Acquisitions 
 2008: OpenAir – web-based timesheets and expense reports
 2009: QuickArrow – web-based professional services automation application
 2013: Retail Anywhere – retail e-commerce software
 2013: TribeHR – human resource software for small to medium-sized businesses
 2013: Order Motion – cloud-based direct-to-consumer order management system
 2013: LightCMS – content management software
 2014: Venda – retail e-commerce software
 2014: eBizNET solutions – advanced warehouse management
 2015: Bronto Software – email service provider
 2015: Monexa – subscription billing and recurring payment
2021: FarApp - provides e-commerce, logistics, retail, and hospitality connectors for Oracle NetSuite
2022: Verenia CPQ - allows customers to generate sales proposals directly from NetSuite ERP
2022: ADI Insights - overtime management, time capture, demand forecasting, and shift scheduling

Awards 

 2021: CRN Product of the Year for CRM/ERP
 2021 Leader in Gartner Magic Quadrant for Cloud Core financial Management suites for Midsize, Large and Global Enterprises
 2022: Inc. Power Partner for Cloud Computing
 2022: Leader in Gartner Magic Quadrant for Cloud ERP for Service-Centric Enterprises
 2022: IT Business Edge’s Best CRM & Software Systems

See also 
 Accounting software
 Applicant tracking system
 Comparison of accounting software
 Customer relationship management
 Comparison of CRM systems
Comparison of embedded CRM systems
 Comparison of PSA systems
 E-commerce
 Enterprise resource planning
 Human resource management system
 Professional services automation

References

External links 
 Company website
 NetSuite Solution Provider - Turkey

Oracle acquisitions
Accounting software
ERP software companies
Cloud computing providers
Human resource management software
Software companies established in 1998
Companies formerly listed on the New York Stock Exchange
2007 initial public offerings
2016 mergers and acquisitions
Software companies disestablished in 2016
Defunct companies based in the San Francisco Bay Area
Companies based in Austin, Texas
Financial software companies
Business software companies
Software companies of the United States